Paratylenchus tenuicaudatus is a plant pathogenic nematode infecting soybeans.

This species has characters close to Paratylenchus hamatus, P. elachistus, and P. nanus, but differs from these species in having a long slender tail, in having the vulva in a more forward position, in having a more massive basal bulb of the esophagus, and in the fact that it is a considerably larger species.

References

External links 
 Nemaplex, University of California - Paratylenchus

Tylenchida
Soybean diseases
Agricultural pest nematodes